Yury Naumovich Vengerovsky (26 October 1938 – 4 December 1998) was a Ukrainian volleyball player who competed for the Soviet Union in the 1964 Summer Olympics.

He was Jewish, born in Kharkiv, and died in Belgorod, Russia.

In 1964, he was part of the Soviet team which won the gold medal in the Olympic tournament. He played all nine matches.

See also
List of select Jewish volleyball players

References

External links
profile

Ukrainian men's volleyball players
Soviet men's volleyball players
Russian men's volleyball players
Olympic volleyball players of the Soviet Union
Volleyball players at the 1964 Summer Olympics
Olympic gold medalists for the Soviet Union
Olympic medalists in volleyball
Sportspeople from Kharkiv
Medalists at the 1964 Summer Olympics
1938 births
1998 deaths